The Studebaker-Packard Hawk series were cars produced by the merged Studebaker-Packard corporation between 1956 and 1964.  All but the 1958 Packard Hawk were badged Studebaker.  Described by the company as "family sports cars", they were all two-door, four-seat coupes and hardtops. They were an evolution of the long wheelbase (120") 1953 C/K models designed by Robert Bourke, lead designer with the Raymond Loewy Agency.  The 1962 redesign as the GT Hawk was by another famed stylist, Brooks Stevens.

The precursor of the Hawks was the 1955 Studebaker Speedster, a special edition hardtop based on the Studebaker President with stainless steel trim above the rear window, usually fog lights on the front bumper, deluxe leather interior, a special dash and unique two tone paint combinations. The success of the Speedster led to the expanded line of 1956 Hawks as a competitor to the Ford Thunderbird and the Oldsmobile Starfire.

The four-model Hawk range launched in 1956, mirrored the engine and trim levels of the sedans. The Golden Hawk, fitted with Packard's powerful big-block 352 cubic inch 275 hp (5.8 L) V8, was the best all-around high performance car of 1956. Some feel by installing the largest V8 in the smallest lightest body, Studebaker created the first muscle car eight years before the GTO. It had the second highest power-to-weight ratio of any American production car. Contemporary road tests verified the Golden Hawk was faster/quicker in the 1/4 mile than the Corvette, Thunderbird and Chrysler 300B. In top speed, only the Chrysler 300B could equal it.

By 1956, Studebaker-Packard's financial condition had deteriorated to the point where there was no choice but to discontinue all manufacturing in the Packard facilities.  Packard's Detroit factory and Utica proving grounds were closed. In a stop-gap effort to buy time for the development and financing of an all-new Packard, and to honor existing dealer contracts, a 1957 Packard that was merely a dressed up Studebaker President went into production at Studebaker's factory in South Bend. As Packard's V8 was no longer being produced, the new Packard as well as the 1957 Golden Hawk were fitted with Studebaker's largest 289 in³ V8, equipped with a McCulloch supercharger to produce the same  rated power output as the 1956 Packard V8.  The range was simplified; the Sky Hawk was discontinued as too close to the Golden Hawk, while the two lowest models were replaced with a single Silver Hawk model, available with either the Champion straight-6 or 259 cubic inch (4.2 L) V8.  1958 saw a restyled and re-badged luxury version of the Golden Hawk sold as the Packard Hawk.  

Studebaker sales continued a rapid decline in 1957-58, so for 1959 Studebaker-Packard discontinued the hardtop Golden Hawk, all Packards, and the Studebaker sedans; the Silver Hawk coupe was the only holdover left alongside the new Studebaker Lark range.  It was a make-or-break year, but Studebaker's big gamble paid off; the smaller-appearing Lark was actually just the six-year-old sedans with a shorter wheelbase and abbreviated front and rear sheetmetal, but it was in the right place at the right time, a car the market wanted.  The Silver Hawk served as a useful showroom draw, and it was continued; since it was the only Hawk model left, it was renamed simply the Studebaker Hawk and continued under that name through the end of 1961.

For the 1962 model year, Brooks Stevens restyled the GT Hawk and it was launched as the Gran Turismo Hawk.  Its styling was well received, and sold relatively well for 1962.  By 1963, Studebaker sales were in an irreversible death spiral. Even though the 1964 Super Hawk, available with an optional R2 supercharged engine, 4-speed transmission, TwinTraction limited-slip differential, front disc brakes and a sport suspension, was the best Hawk ever, production was ended with the rest of Studebaker's US production in December 1963.

Hawk
Packard vehicles